Leslie B. Bancroft-Krichko (born February 22, 1959, in Portland, Maine) is an American cross-country skier who competed from 1979 to 1988. She finished eighth in the 4 × 5 km relay at the 1988 Winter Olympics in Calgary. Bancroft-Krichko was also a skier at the University of Vermont.

Cross-country skiing results
All results are sourced from the International Ski Federation (FIS).

Olympic Games

World Cup

Season standings

References

External links
Women's 4 x 5 km cross-country relay Olympic results: 1976-2002 

1959 births
Living people
Sportspeople from Portland, Oregon
American female cross-country skiers
Cross-country skiers at the 1980 Winter Olympics
Cross-country skiers at the 1988 Winter Olympics
Olympic cross-country skiers of the United States
University of Vermont alumni
Vermont Catamounts skiers
20th-century American women